Ponton station is a flag stop station in Ponton, Manitoba, Canada.  The stop is served by Via Rail's Winnipeg – Churchill train.

See also
 Ponton train derailment

References

External links 
Via Rail Station Information

Via Rail stations in Manitoba